Oh My God (later retitled God: The Almighty Question) is a 2009 documentary film by commercial director Peter Rodger. The filmmaker asked people across the world the question "What is God?" Notable figures interviewed include Ringo Starr, Hugh Jackman, David Copperfield, Seal, Bob Geldof, Baz Luhrmann, Jack Thompson, Princess Michael of Kent and Lawrence Blair.

The film contains production credit from Rodger's future wife, Soumaya Akaaboune, as well as a special thanks credit to Rodger's son, Elliot.

Cultural references
The film is mentioned in the manifesto of Elliot Rodger, the perpetrator of the 2014 Isla Vista killings, and son of the film's director on how his father said he would become rich from the film, but only sent him into bankruptcy.

References

External links

Filmmaker interview at the Lilou Mace website

2009 films
Documentary films about religion
2009 documentary films
American documentary films
2009 independent films
American independent films
2000s English-language films
2000s American films